Sırrı Yırcalı Anatolian High School (in Balıkesir, Turkey, was founded in 1984 with the name of Balıkesir Anadolu Lisesi. In 1987, SYAL moved to its new building constructed with the help of the well known businessman Sırrı Yırcalı.

SYAL, located eastern exit of Bursa-Istanbul road and neighbour of Balıkesir Fen Lisesi, has 826 student with 60 teacher capacity. It constructed on 27.000 m2 area with 1551 m2 school building, 820 m2 hall, 1000 m2 sport center, front and back gardens, 3 basketball fields, 2 football fields and 1 tennis court.

SYAL is well-known high school with students' remarkable success in general exams as LYS and YGS, championships in several sport branches, education quality in language and students' discipline which has been the main role of the school's success. Also, one of ten schools which are 5-year education as 4-year high school education with one-year language education is SYAL.

In 2008–2009 SYAL was the winner of the Competition of Best-Looking School Gardens, and in 2005–2006 it was 3rd of the Competition of Educational Quality for Turkey.

External links
 SYAL official website
 SYAL Students' Website

High schools in Balıkesir
Educational institutions established in 1984
1984 establishments in Turkey
Education in Balıkesir
Anatolian High Schools